Sherri Field (born March 13, 1972 in Moncton, New Brunswick) is a former field hockey player from Canada, who represented her native country at the 1992 Summer Olympics in Barcelona, Spain. There she ended up in seventh place with the Canadian National Team. She is now the Director of Athletics at a school (Kingsway College School) in Etobicoke.

References
 Canadian Olympic Committee

External links
 

1972 births
Living people
Canadian female field hockey players
Olympic field hockey players of Canada
Field hockey players at the 1992 Summer Olympics
Sportspeople from Moncton